Rs1954787 is a gene variation, a single nucleotide polymorphism (SNP) in the GRIK4 gene.
A study has reported that this polymorphism is associated with success of antidepressant treatment.

References

SNPs on chromosome 11